Kadasikada  is a small village/hamlet located between "Pampupara" and "Puttadi" of Kattappana Block in Idukki district of Kerala, India. It is part of Vandanmedu Panchayath in Central Kerala Division.

Language 
Malayalam and Tamil are widely spoken by natives. Most of them are literate in Hindi and English too.

Transport 
Being located on Kumily Munnar route, this place is well connected through road.  People depend Buses, Autos and Jeeps to meet their local transportation requirements.
The nearest railway stations are Kottayam and Changanassery. Airports are Kochi and Madurai.

Religious Places 
The famous places of worship in Kadassikada are -
Siva Parvathi temple, Kadassikkada
Mariyamman Kovil, Pampupara
Mangala Devi temple
Juma Masjid Kadassikkada
CSI Church
Full gospel church of christ India

Education 
There are no schools or colleges in Kadassikada except Anganvadi or pre-school facilities. and the aspiring students need to travel to Anakkara, Puttadi, Kumily, Kattappana and Kumily for schooling and higher studies.

References 

Villages in Idukki district